Andrianna Campbell-LaFleur is an American art critic, curator, and historian specializing in nineteenth and twentieth-century American art.

Early life and education 
Campbell-LaFleur studied at the Rhode Island School of Design (RISD), where she received her BFA degree in printmaking in 2001. While at RISD, the RISD Museum awarded her a Carnegie Fellowship. She then worked as the associate curator at Forbes, where she managed an international art collection. 

She received a doctorate from the Department of Art History at the Graduate Center, CUNY in 2020, with her research focused on the artist Norman Lewis and Abstract Expressionism.

Career 
Campbell-LaFleur has authored essays on contemporary art for Artforum, Art in America, and frieze. In 2016, she co-edited an edition of the International Review of African American Art dedicated to Norman Lewis. She is also a founding editor of apricota, a journal focused on art writing and history, alongside Joanna Fiduccia.

Following the election of President Donald Trump in November 2016, Campbell-LaFleur collaborated with MoveOn.org to encourage artists to create graphics, signs, and slogans to support the 2017 Women's March and, in her own words, "promote positive change, not perpetuate the negative rhetoric coming from the President-elect."

In October 2017, Campbell-LaFleur opened a pop-up shop named Anger Management inside of the Brooklyn Museum, with visual artist Marilyn Minter. The shop aimed to serve as an outlet of protest for more than 70 artists, of which Campbell-LaFleur and Minter recruited as vendors for the shop. Its proceeds would be distributed between Planned Parenthood, the American Civil Liberties Union, or a different charity of an artist's choice. Discussing the venture, Campbell-LaFleur commented that "circulating images, like those created by the Anger Management vendors, contributes to a feeling of solidarity".

See also 

 Women in the art history field

References

External links 
 
 Andrianna Campbell-LaFleur's articles in Artforum
 Andrianna Campbell-LaFleur's articles in frieze

Living people
21st-century African-American women
21st-century African-American people
American art curators
American women curators
American art critics
American art historians
Women art historians
Rhode Island School of Design alumni
Year of birth missing (living people)